José Larraz López (Cariñena, 27 April 1904 – Madrid, 17 November 1973) was a Spanish politician who served as Minister of Finance of Spain between 1939 and 1941, during the Francoist dictatorship.

References

1904 births
1973 deaths
Economy and finance ministers of Spain
Government ministers during the Francoist dictatorship